The 2023 Akwa Ibom State House of Assembly election will take place on 11 March 2023, to elect members of the Akwa Ibom State House of Assembly. The election will be held concurrent with the state gubernatorial election as well as twenty-seven other gubernatorial elections and elections to all other state houses of assembly. It will be held two weeks after the presidential election and National Assembly elections.

Electoral system
The members of state Houses of Assembly are elected using first-past-the-post voting in single-member constituencies.

Background
In the previous House of Assembly elections, the PDP won a sizeable majority that elected Aniekan Bassey (PDP-Uruan) as Speaker. In other Akwa Ibom elections, incumbent Governor Udom Gabriel Emmanuel (PDP) won in a landslide. The PDP was also successful federally, unseating all APC senators and house members to sweep all three senate and ten House of Representatives seats as the state was easily won by PDP presidential nominee Atiku Abubakar with about 68% but still swung towards the APC and had lower turnout.

Key events during the legislative term included the belated swearing-in of the Assembly's sole APC member—Effiong Johnson (Mbo)—in December 2019, reports on systemic misappropriation of public funds and corruption by the Assembly, and votes on various constitutional amendments in July 2022.

Overview

Summary

Notes

See also 
 2023 Nigerian elections
 2023 Nigerian House of Assembly elections

References 

House of Assembly
2023
Akwa Ibom